Kaimar is an Estonian-language male given name.

People named Kaimar include:
 Kaimar Karu (born 1980), Estonian politician
 Kaimar Saag (born 1988), Estonian footballer

References

Estonian masculine given names